The 2019 Big Ten Conference baseball tournament was held at TD Ameritrade Park Omaha in Omaha, Nebraska, from May 22 through 26. The event aired on the Big Ten Network.

Format and seeding
The 2019 tournament was an 8 team double-elimination tournament. The top eight teams based on conference regular season winning percentage earned invites to the tournament. The teams then played a double-elimination tournament leading to a single championship game. A run rule (10 run lead after 7 innings) was in effect for the tournament.

Bracket

Conference championship

References

Tournament
Big Ten Baseball Tournament
Big Ten baseball tournament
Big Ten baseball tournament